The 1987 Rothmans Matchroom League was a professional non-ranking snooker tournament that was played from January to May 1987.

Steve Davis topped the table and won the tournament. 


League phase

The table points were decided by frame wins, followed by match wins to determine players' positions. If two players had an identical record then the result in their match determined their positions. If that ended 4–4 then the player who got to four first was higher.

 17 January – Torbay Leisure Centre
  Dennis Taylor 4–4 Terry Griffiths
  Steve Davis 7–1 Willie Thorne
 18 January –  St David's Hall, Cardiff
 Dennis Taylor 7–1 Tony Meo
 Steve Davis 4–4 Terry Griffiths
 24 January – Central Hall, York
 Terry Griffiths 5–3 Tony Meo
 Jimmy White 5–3 Dennis Taylor
 14 February – Granby Halls Leisure Centre, Leicester
 Neal Foulds 6–2 Cliff Thorburn
 Willie Thorne 4–4 Jimmy White
 14 March – Woodford Leisure Centre, Kingston-upon-Hull
 Neal Foulds 4–4 Terry Griffiths
 Steve Davis 7–1 Tony Meo
 15 March – Mansfield Leisure Centre
 Willie Thorne 5–3 Terry Griffiths
 Steve Davis 6–2 Neal Foulds
 4 April – Brighton Centre
 Cliff Thorburn 5–3 Willie Thorne
 Steve Davis 6–2 Dennis Taylor
 5 April – Derngate, Northampton
 Neal Foulds 5–3 Dennis Taylor
 Cliff Thorburn 5–3 Steve Davis
 11 April – Richard Dunn Sports Centre, Bradford
  Neal Foulds 4–4 Willie Thorne
 Tony Meo 7–1 Jimmy White
 12 April – Fairfield Halls, Croydon
 Jimmy White 6–2 Terry Griffiths
 Dennis Taylor 5–3 Cliff Thorburn
 9 May – Gloucester Leisure Centre
 Tony Meo 6–2 Willie Thorne
 Cliff Thorburn 4–4 Jimmy White
 10 May – Assembly Rooms, Derby
 Terry Griffiths 6–2 Cliff Thorburn
 Jimmy White 5–3 Steve Davis
 16 May – Cleethorpes Leisure Centre
 'Tony Meo 4–4 Cliff Thorburn
 Neal Foulds 6–2 Jimmy White
 17 May – Everton Park Sports Centre, Liverpool
 Neal Foulds 4–4 Tony Meo
 Dennis Taylor 4–4 Willie Thorne

References

Premier League Snooker
1987 in snooker
1987 in British sport